The 2018 Uzbekistan Pro-B League is the 1st since its establishment. The competition started on 12 March 2018.

Teams

League table

Promotion play-offs 

Mash'al and Istiqlol qualified for 2018 Uzbekistan Super League relegation play-off

References

External links 
Uzbekistan Pro League at PFL.uz
Uzbekistan Pro League News

2018
2018 in Uzbekistani football leagues